Tania González Peñas (born 18 October 1982 in Avilés, Asturias) is a Spanish politician, political scientist, and MEP of Podemos, since September 11, 2014, when she replaced Carlos Jiménez Villarejo, who was one of the five members of the party elected in the 2014 European Parliament election.

References

External links 
 Tania González Peñas at the European Parliament

Living people
1982 births
People from Avilés
MEPs for Spain 2014–2019
Spanish political scientists
Podemos (Spanish political party) MEPs
Women political scientists